Darius Madison (born May 31, 1994) is an American professional soccer player.

Career
Madison played fours years of college soccer, including three years at the University of Virginia and a single year at the University of Maryland, Baltimore County.

Madison also played with USL PDL side Reading United from 2013 to 2015.

On January 19, 2016, Madison was selected in the fourth round (70th overall) of the 2016 MLS SuperDraft by Toronto FC. However, he wasn't signed by the club and instead joined PDL side Kitsap Pumas for their 2016 season.

Madison signed with United Soccer League club Rochester Rhinos on February 13, 2017.

In February 2018, Madison moved to Geelong, Australia, signing for North Geelong Warriors FC, a club competing in the National Premier Leagues Victoria 2. Madison started life at his new club by scoring on debut, the winner in a 1–0 win over Melbourne Victory FC Reserves at Epping Stadium. Madison finished the season with 13 goals, the third highest tally in NPL2 West. At the club's end-of-season awards night, Madison claimed the Fans' Player of the Year award.

References

External links
 Australian League Stats

1994 births
Living people
American soccer players
Virginia Cavaliers men's soccer players
UMBC Retrievers men's soccer players
Reading United A.C. players
Kitsap Pumas players
Rochester New York FC players
North Geelong Warriors FC players
USL League Two players
USL Championship players
Soccer players from Philadelphia
Toronto FC draft picks
American expatriate sportspeople in Australia
Association football forwards
Expatriate soccer players in Australia
American expatriate soccer players